The Gurma languages, also known as the West Mabia languages, form part of the Oti–Volta subgroup of the Gur languages. They are spoken in eastern Burkina Faso, northern Ghana, Togo and Benin and western Niger.

The languages are:
 Ngangam
 Gourmanchéma (Gurma)
 Moba (Bimoba)
 Ntcham (Akaselem)
 Miyobe
 Konkomba

References 

 
Oti–Volta languages